Milano Serravalle – Milano Tangenziali S.p.A. is an Italian transport company. The company owned the concession until 2028 on Milan to Serravalle Scrivia section of Autostrada A7, as well as the concession of the ring roads or bypass road ( and plural ) surrounding Milan (A50, A51 and A52). The company was the holding company (78.972% stake) of Autostrada Pedemontana Lombarda, the operator of A36 (Cassano Magnago to Lentate sul Seveso).

The company also had equity interests in Tangenziali Esterne di Milano, a sub-holding company for the operator of A58 (Milan East Tangenziale; 47.66% stake) and the operator of A15 (Parma to La Spezia; 5.37% stake), as well as Autostrade Lombarde (2.7794% stake), another holding company for the operator of A35 (Provinces of Brescia, Bergamo and Milan).

The company sold the equity interests (4.6671%) in A4 Holding (the operator of Brescia–Padua section of Autostrada A4) to Società delle Autostrade Serenissima in 2014 for €44,151,210. However, until the final payment in 2019, the stake was mandated by Unione Fiduciaria.

Shareholders

 Azienda Sviluppo Ambiente e Mobilità (Lombardy region via Finlombarda) (52.902%)
 Milan Comune (18.600%)
 Società Iniziative Autostradali e Servizi (10.656%)
 Province of Pavia (4.189%)
 Milan Chamber of Commerce (4.000%)
 direct (0.000%)
 Parcam (4.000%)
 Province of Como (3.634%)
 Autostrada dei Fiori (2.884%)
 Pavia Chamber of Commerce (1.560%)
 Pavia Comune (0.907%)
 Genoa Port Authority (0.283%)
 Como Comune (0.200%)
 Como Chamber of Commerce (0.127%)
 ASTM (0.048%)
 Società Autostrada Torino–Alessandria–Piacenza (0.007%)
 Province of Lecco (0.003%)
 Metropolitan City of Milan (0.000%)

References

External links
 

Private road operators of Italy
Transport in Lombardy
Companies based in Lombardy
Metropolitan City of Milan
Region-owned companies of Italy